Lance Christopher Long (born May 4, 1985) is a former American football wide receiver. He was signed by the Arizona Cardinals as an undrafted free agent in 2008. He played college football at Mississippi State.

He was also a member of the Kansas City Chiefs and Jacksonville Jaguars.

Professional career

Kansas City Chiefs
Long was released by the Kansas City Chiefs on August 31, 2010

Jacksonville Jaguars
He was picked up by the Jacksonville Jaguars on September 22, 2010.

San Francisco 49ers
He was released by the San Francisco 49ers on September 3, 2011.

Detroit Lions
Long signed with Detroit on May 1, 2012. He was released on August 31 for final roster cuts before the start of the 2012 season.
The Lions re-signed him on December 5, 2012. Long was waived again on December 14.

He signed a futures contract with the Detroit Lions on January 1, 2013.

References

External links
Detroit Lions bio
Mississippi State Bulldogs bio

1985 births
Living people
Players of American football from Michigan
American football wide receivers
Toledo Rockets football players
Mississippi State Bulldogs football players
Arizona Cardinals players
Kansas City Chiefs players
Jacksonville Jaguars players
San Francisco 49ers players
Detroit Lions players